Outer Limits is a Japanese progressive rock band. The band has been active during the 1980s, then separated in 1990, and reunited in 1998.

Discography
1985 : Misty Moon
1986 : A Boy Playing the Magical Bugle Horn
1987 : The Scene of Pale Blue
1989 : Outer Mania
1989 : Silver Apples on the Moon (live)
2007 : Stromatolite

External links
 Outer Limits Official Web Page

Japanese progressive rock groups
Symphonic rock groups